Polynoncus guttifer is a species of hide beetle in the subfamily Omorginae found in Paraguay, Argentina, and Chile.

References

guttifer
Beetles described in 1868